The 1990 Southern Conference baseball tournament was held at College Park in Charleston, South Carolina, from April 26 through 29. Top seeded The Citadel won the tournament and earned the Southern Conference's automatic bid to the 1990 NCAA Division I baseball tournament en route to their appearance in the 1990 College World Series. It was the Bulldogs first tournament win.

The tournament used a double-elimination format. All seven teams participated, with the top seed receiving a single bye.

The 1990 event was the first of nineteen consecutive SoCon tournaments held in Charleston; first at College Park, then at Joseph P. Riley Jr. Park beginning with that stadium's opening in 1997.

Seeding

Results

Game results

All-Tournament Team 
The 1990 event was the first at which an All-Tournament team was named.

References 

Tournament
Southern Conference Baseball Tournament
Southern Conference baseball tournament
Southern Conference baseball tournament